The Scripps National Spelling Bee (formerly the Scripps Howard National Spelling Bee and commonly called the National Spelling Bee) is an annual spelling bee held in the United States. The bee is run on a not-for-profit basis by The E. W. Scripps Company and is held at a hotel or convention center in the Washington, D.C. metropolitan area during the week following Memorial Day weekend. Since 2011, it has been held at the Gaylord National Resort & Convention Center hotel in National Harbor in Oxon Hill, Maryland, just outside Washington D.C. It was previously held at the Grand Hyatt Washington in Washington D.C. from 1996 to 2010.

Although most of its participants are from the U.S., students from countries such as The Bahamas, Canada, the People's Republic of China, India, Ghana, Japan, Jamaica, Mexico, and New Zealand have also competed in recent years. Historically, the competition has been open to, and remains open to, the winners of sponsored regional spelling bees in the U.S. (including territories such as Guam, American Samoa, Puerto Rico, the Navajo Nation, and the U.S. Virgin Islands, along with overseas military bases in Germany and South Korea). Participants from countries other than the U.S. must be regional spelling-bee winners as well.

Contest participants cannot be older than fourteen as of August 31 of the year before the competition; nor can they be past the eighth grade as of February 1 of that year's competition. Previous winners are also ineligible to compete.

In 2019, the Spelling Bee ran out of words that might challenge the contestants and ended up having 8 winners. The 2020 National Spelling Bee competition, originally scheduled for May 24, was suspended and later canceled due to the COVID-19 pandemic. This was the first time it had been canceled since 1945.

History

The National Spelling Bee was formed in 1925 as a consolidation of numerous local spelling bees, organized by The Courier-Journal in Louisville, Kentucky. Frank Neuhauser won the first National Spelling Bee held that year, by successfully spelling "gladiolus". The spelling bee has been held every year except for 1943–1945 due to World War II and 2020 due to the COVID-19 pandemic. The E.W. Scripps Company acquired the rights to the program in 1941. The Bee is held in late May and/or early June of each year. It is open to students who have not yet completed the eighth grade, reached their 15th birthday, nor won a previous National Spelling Bee. Its goal is educational: not only to encourage children to perfect the art of spelling, but also to help enlarge their vocabularies and widen their knowledge of the English language.

The Bee is the nation's largest and longest-running educational promotion, administered on a not-for-profit basis by The E.W. Scripps Company and 291 sponsors in the United States, Europe, Canada, New Zealand, Guam, Jamaica, The Bahamas, Ghana, Puerto Rico, the U.S. Virgin Islands, and American Samoa.

The competition

Qualifying regional competitions

To qualify for the Scripps National Spelling Bee, a speller must win a regional competition. Regional spelling bees usually cover many counties, with some covering an entire state, U.S. territory, or foreign country. Regional competitions' rules are not required to correspond exactly to those of the national competition; most notably, the national competition has since 2004 featured time controls that are designed to ensure its conformity to the programming schedule of its nationwide television broadcaster (see Regulations of oral rounds below) and that are not intended to be implemented at lower levels of competition.

Most school and regional bees (known to Scripps as local spelling bees) use the official study booklet. Through competition year 1994, the study booklet was known as Words of the Champions; during competition years 1995 through 2006, the study booklet was the category-based Paideia; in 2007 the format and title were changed to the 701-word Spell It!, and in 2020 a new edition of Words of the Champions is used. The booklet is published by Merriam-Webster in association with the National Spelling Bee. It contains 1,155 words, divided primarily by language of origin, along with exercises and activities in each section. Most bees whose winners advance to regional-level competition use the School Pronouncer's Guide, which contains a collection of Words of the Champions words as well as "off-list words" not listed in Words of the Champions but featured in Scripps' official dictionary, the unabridged Webster's Third New International Dictionary (published by Merriam-Webster).

Scripps provides a Sponsor Bee Guide to administrators of regional bees. The Sponsor Bee Guide consists of two volumes, each of which contains both words from Words of the Champions and "surprise words". Bees need not use the words from Words of the Champions to be considered official.

Sponsors
To participate in the national competition, a speller must be sponsored. Scripps has 281 sponsors (mostly newspapers) from the U.S., Canada, The Bahamas, New Zealand, Asia, and Europe covering a certain area and conducting their own regional spelling bees to send spellers to the national level.

Sponsorship is available on a limited basis to daily and weekly newspapers serving English-speaking populations around the world. Each sponsor organizes a spelling bee program in its community with the cooperation of area school officials: public, private, parochial, charter, virtual, and home schools.

Schools enroll with the national office to ensure their students are eligible to participate and to receive the materials needed to conduct classroom and school bees. During enrollment, school bee coordinators receive their local sponsor's program-specific information—local dates, deadlines, and participation guidelines.

National-competition format

Preliminaries
The Preliminaries consists of a test (Preliminaries Test) delivered by computer on Tuesday and two rounds of oral spelling onstage on Wednesday. Spellers may earn up to 36 points during the Preliminaries: up to 30 points on the Preliminaries Test, three points for correctly spelling in Round Two and three points for correctly spelling in Round Three.

Round One
The Preliminaries Test (also called round one) has four sections, most of which administered by a computer system. Round One of the preliminaries consists of two sections; Section A consists of spelling 24 words, identical for each contestant, while Section B contains 24 multiple-choice vocabulary questions; only 12 questions in each section are actually scored, awarding one point each. Section C and D, preliminary rounds two and three, each consist of a single multiple-choice vocabulary question unique to every contestant and worth three points. A contestant can score up to 30 points in this round.

History of Round One
Round One was a written spelling test, and has changed in format several times. In the few years prior to 2008, Round One consisted of a 25-word, multiple-choice written test. However, in 2010, changes were made in the formatting of this test. It consisted of 25 words, sometimes called "the written round". All spellers gathered at the Maryland Ballroom by 8:00 a.m. Jacques Bailly, the Bee's official pronouncer (also the 1980 champion) pronounced each word, its language of origin, definition, and usage in a sentence. Spellers are given a 30-second pause in which to write down their word with the two pens given to them, and then Bailly repeated the word and all information. There was another 30-second pause, and then they moved onto the next word. Each correctly spelled word on the Round One written test was worth one point. In 2011, they stayed with that format. In 2012, they changed to the original computerized test, 50 spelling words, half scored and half not scored.

Beginning in 2013, the test now includes vocabulary questions, such as being asked to choose the correct definition for a word. While met with criticism by past contestants for deviating from the concept of a spelling bee, organizers indicated that the change was made to help avert perceptions that the competition was based solely on memorization skills (as had been showcased by television broadcasts), and to help further the Bee's goal of expanding the vocabulary and language skills of children.

Round Two
Round Two is an oral round, in which each contestant must spell a different word from the "Words of the Champions" list as specified by the judges. A correct spelling awards three points, while a miss eliminates the contestant. In the latter case, the judges give the correct spelling. All contestants eliminated in this round tie for the same place in the final rankings.

Round Three
Round Three follows the same format as Round Two, but each contestant's word is chosen from the Merriam-Webster Unabridged Dictionary. After this round, the remaining contestants' total scores are used to determine the semifinalists.

Semifinals
Round Four was recently changed in 2016. Scripps recently dropped the semi-finals test and added a Tiebreaker Test (however, it was only used in 2017 and 2018), in which the spellers took a test similar to the preliminaries test, but containing harder and confusing words. As a result, there was controversy and Scripps dropped the Tiebreaker Test in 2019, in which eight co-champions won. Round Four is now oral and the start of the finals, in which no more than 50 spellers compete. There is no study list for this round and the rest of the finals.

Finals
At the end of the semifinals, the remaining spellers thin out into 10-16 and all the remaining spellers are invited to spell in the finals. This can go on until the word list is exhausted and the judges move on to the 25 championship rounds until a champion, or a group of joint champions, is crowned.

A rule added in 2021 provided that in case of the competition running overly long, the remaining spellers would compete in a "Spell-off," in which each speller is given the same list of words and 90 seconds to spell as many words as possible; each speller is sequestered until it is their turn to compete. Unlike in regular competition, the definition, language of origin, and part of speech of each word is displayed on a monitor. The speller is allowed to ask questions of the pronouncer, however, they are using their own time to do so. The winner would be the speller that spelled the most words correctly within their 90 seconds (words not completed within the time do not count towards the tally); in case of a tie, the speller with fewer incorrect spellings would win. The Spell-off was retained for, and first used in, the 2022 competition.

Regulations of oral rounds
Before 2004, a speller could not be required to spell a given word until the judges deemed that the word had been clearly pronounced and identified by the speller; even then, judges rarely if ever instructed a contestant to begin spelling unless it was obvious that the speller was making no further progress in figuring out the word and that he/she was instead simply "stalling for time". Most local and regional competitions continue to follow this rule and enforcement pattern, although they are not obliged to do so.

Starting in 2004, the Bee adopted new rules. A speller is given two and a half minutes from when a word is first pronounced to spell it completely. The first two minutes are Regular Time; the final thirty seconds are Finish Time. During this time limit, a speller is allowed to ask the pronouncer for the word's:

 Definition
 Part of speech
 Use in a sentence
 Language(s) of origin (the complete etymology of the word is not provided)
 Alternate pronunciations
 Root (A speller may ask whether a word comes from a particular root word or word element, but the competitor must specify that root's language of origin and definition.)
Repeat the word

A chime signals that regular time has expired, and the judges inform the speller that Finish Time has begun. The speller may watch a clock counting down from thirty seconds; no timing devices are allowed onstage. During Finish Time, a speller may not make further requests to the pronouncer but rather must begin spelling the word. Any speller who exceeds the time limit is automatically eliminated; judges do not acknowledge letters spelled after the end of Finish Time. A speller is allowed to stop spelling a word and restart spelling, but if (s)he changes the letters already said, the alteration counts as a misspelling and causes automatic elimination.

Starting in the 2015 bee, the time limit was reduced to two minutes, indicated by a monitor with a traffic light on it. For the first 75 seconds, the traffic light is green. Once 45 seconds remain, the light turns yellow and a countdown appears on the screen. While the light is green or yellow, the speller is free to request information from the pronouncer as listed above. Once 30 seconds remain, the light turns red and the speller must begin spelling the word as in Finish Time above.

Recent spelling bees

Proposed international bee
In May 2012, Scripps announced tentative plans for an international version, in which three-person teams from as many as sixty countries would compete. Although each speller would be able to confer with teammates once during each contest, all spellers would eventually compete and win prizes as individuals. If logistical and financial details can be reached, the event would be officially announced in early 2013 with the first competition to take place the following December. As of 2015, these plans are on hold.

Champions and winning words

Prizes
As of the 2019 competition, the first place prize was raised from $40,000 to $50,000, and in the event of a tie, the two winners will split the first and second place ($25,000) awards ($37,500 each).

The winner also receives other prizes, such as an engraved loving cup trophy from Scripps, a $2,500 savings bond, a reference library from Merriam-Webster, $400 in reference works and a lifetime membership to Britannica Online Premium from Encyclopædia Britannica, and an online course and a Nook eReader from K12 Inc.

All spellers receive Webster's Third New International Dictionary, Unabridged on CD-ROM from Merriam-Webster; the Samuel Louis Sugarman Award, which is a $100 U.S. Savings Bond; a cash prize from Scripps for contestants who reach the Semi-finals; and as of 2015, a Microsoft Surface 3 with keyboard and stylus.  The cash prizes are determined based on the round, and can be as much as $12,500 (for the second-place finisher). In 2014, spellers eliminated before the Semi-finals began receiving educational tools from Microsoft instead of a $100 cash prize given in years past. All other prizes remained unchanged.

Historical format and prizes

For the first three decades of the bee (1925–1957), the spelling competition was held on a single day. This presented no problem in the Bee's early years, which had only nine contestants in 1925, and did not crack 50 contestants before 1950. After the 1957 bee took almost 10 hours to complete (the second-ever tie after the word list was exhausted), the bee moved to a two-day format in 1958. As the number of contestants continued to increase (first breaking 100 in 1978), an opening practice round was eliminated at the 1987 bee due to a record 185 entrants.

After a three-day bee was held for the first time in 2001, a written test was added for the first time in 2002 to help keep the bee to two days of competition. In 2002 and 2003, a 25-word written test was given after an opening oral round.

For most of its early years, the first place prize was either $500 or $1000. It was $500 in gold pieces in the first bee in 1925, and doubled to $1000 the next year. It dropped back to $500 in the 1933 bee during the Great Depression, and only returned to $1000 in 1956. In 1987, the first place prize was raised to $1,500, and all spellers after reaching 10th place received $50. By 1993 it was $5,000. In 2007, the prize was $50,000 in cash, but in 2009, the prize dropped to $35,000 in cash and more than $5,000 in prizes. In 2012, the prize dropped yet again to $30,000 in cash and just over $10,000 in prizes, savings bonds, and scholarships. In 2015, the prize increased to $38,600 in cash, and increased again in 2016 to $40,000 cash prize, where it stayed the same until 2018, when the prize was increased to $50,000 cash, which was equivalent to the cash prize eleven years before.

Media coverage 
CNN was one of the first television channels to carry coverage of the Scripps National Spelling Bee, with personalities including Anderson Cooper and 1979 champion Katie McCrimmon. Scripps CEO Rich Boehne described its coverage as having been "very hit or miss", explaining that "I'd sit and watch and see a little snippet of some coverage and then somebody would cut out and go somewhere else." Boehne began to contemplate how the event could be presented for television in a manner that would be more compelling to viewers. In 1994, Scripps began an agreement with ESPN to broadcast coverage of the national finals; the network added a larger focus on analysis and profiles on the competitors. The broadcasts were credited with having brought greater prominence to the event. ESPN would later expand its coverage to encompass the early rounds of the competition as well, and added features such as a "play-along" broadcast on its streaming platforms.

In May 2006, it was announced that the finals of the Scripps National Spelling Bee would be moved to primetime on ESPN's sister broadcast network ABC, with Robin Roberts of ESPN and Good Morning America serving as host. ABC executives positioned the primetime broadcast as a form of reality television, while the move came on the heels of the release of Akeelah and the Bee—a drama film based on the event. By 2013, the ABC broadcast had been dropped, with the finals returning exclusively to ESPN.

In October 2021, Scripps announced that the event's broadcast would move to its co-owned broadcast television networks Bounce TV and Ion Television beginning in 2022; the company promoted that the event would be "accessible to the widest audience in its nearly 100-year history".

In popular culture

Fiction
The drama film Bee Season (2005), based on Myla Goldberg's novel of the same name, follows a young girl's journey through various levels of spelling-bee competition to the Scripps National Spelling Bee, as did the drama film Akeelah and the Bee (2006).

The 2nd episode of season 1 of Psych, "Spellingg Bee", dealt with a murder during a Spelling Bee event.

Contestants in the musical-comedy play The 25th Annual Putnam County Spelling Bee, which ran on Broadway starting in 2005, are competing for a spot in the National Spelling Bee.

The 2013 film Bad Words revolves around a forty-year-old eighth grade dropout (Jason Bateman) attempting to win a fictional equivalent of the SNSB.

Nonfiction
The Netflix documentary Spelling the Dream (2020) chronicles the ups and downs of four Indian-American students as they compete to realize their dream of winning the iconic Scripps National Spelling Bee.

The Academy Award-nominated documentary film Spellbound (2002) follows eight competitors, including eventual national winner Nupur Lala, through the 1999 competition.

The book American Bee, by James Maguire, profiles five spellers who made it to the final rounds of the competition Samir Patel, Katharine Close, Aliya Deri, Jamie Ding, and Marshall Winchester as well as giving an overview of the history of the bee.

Multiple episodes of the ESPN Classic show Cheap Seats featured the hosts revisiting broadcasts of the Bee from the 1990s.

References

Further reading
 Gormley, Amelia. Verbomania: Experiencing the National Spelling Bee. 
 Maguire, James. American Bee: The National Spelling Bee and the Culture of Word Nerds.
 Kimble, Paige, Trinkle, Barrie, and Andrews, Carolyn. "How To Spell Like A Champ".

External links

SpellingBee.com, the competition's official website
2008 Spelling Bee Press Release
Final rounds of 2006 Scripps National Spelling Bee to be broadcast live on ABC during primetime (press release)

 
1925 establishments in the United States
Education competitions in the United States
English orthography
ESPN
Recurring events established in 1925
History of Louisville, Kentucky
Courier Journal